Philosophical fiction refers to the class of works of fiction which devote a significant portion of their content to the sort of questions normally addressed in philosophy. These might explore any facet of the human condition, including the function and role of society, the nature and motivation of human acts, the purpose of life, ethics or morals, the role of art in human lives, the role of experience or reason in the development of knowledge, whether there exists free will, or any other topic of philosophical interest. Philosophical fiction works would include the so-called novel of ideas, including some science fiction, utopian and dystopian fiction, and the Bildungsroman.

Philosophical fiction
 This is only a list of some major philosophical fiction.  For all philosophical novels, see :Category:Philosophical novels.

There is no universally accepted definition of philosophical fiction, but a sampling of notable works can help to outline its history.

Some philosophers write novels, plays, or short fiction in order to demonstrate or introduce their ideas. Common examples include Simone de Beauvoir, Jean-Paul Sartre, Ayn Rand, Albert Camus and Friedrich Nietzsche. Authors who admire certain philosophers may incorporate their ideas into the principal themes or central narratives of novels. Some examples include The Moviegoer (Kierkegaard), Wittgenstein's Mistress (Wittgenstein), and Speedboat'' (post-structuralism).

See also
 Philosophy and literature
 Sci Phi Journal, online magazine dedicated to publishing science and philosophical fiction
 Literary fiction

References

External links
 What is a philosophical novel?
 Philosophy Ethics Short Story Magazine

 
Literary genres